Leon Grange No. 795, also known as the Aiken-Silvernail House, is a historic home located at Leon in Cattaraugus County, New York. It was built in 1903–1904, and is a two-story, three bay by four bay, frame building.  It has a gable roof and is sheathed in clapboard siding.  The building has housed the Leon Historical Society since 1977.

It was listed on the National Register of Historic Places in 2014.

References

Historical society museums in New York (state)
Grange buildings on the National Register of Historic Places in New York (state)
Buildings and structures completed in 1904
Buildings and structures in Cattaraugus County, New York
National Register of Historic Places in Cattaraugus County, New York